Julia Pirotte (née Diament; 1908 – 25 July 2000) was a Polish photojournalist known for her work in Marseille during the Second World War when she documented the French Resistance, and for photographs taken in the aftermath of the Kielce Pogrom of 1946.

Biography

Pirotte was born in Końskowola in Poland. She emigrated to Belgium in 1934 where she married Jean Pirotte, a labor activist in Brussels, and studied photography. In May 1940, after the German occupation of Belgium and the deportation of her husband, Pirotte made her way to southern France, where she played an active role in Jewish and French resistance groups. Based in Marseille, she worked as a photojournalist for Dimanche Illustré and served as a courier for weapons, false papers and underground publications in a resistance group, the FTP-MOI . During this time she took numerous photographs documenting life under the Vichy Regime. As a member of the Francs-Tireurs et Partisans, she was able to photograph the activities of the Maquis resistance in the summer of 1944 and the liberation of Marseille.

After the war, Pirotte returned to Poland as a photojournalist for the Polish periodical Zolnierz Polski. During that period she covered the aftermath of the Kielce Pogrom of 4 July 1946 and attended the World Congress of Intellectuals in Defense of Peace of 1948 in Wrocław, taking portraits of Pablo Picasso, Irène Joliot-Curie and Dominique Desanti. Pirotte visited Israel in 1957. She later married Jefim Sokolski, a Polish economist who died in 1974.

In later years, Pirotte frequently traveled to Belgium, France, and the United States, where, in 1984, the International Center of Photography in New York hosted an exhibition of her work.

After the war, she receives decorations : The Croix de Guerre 1939–1945 which distinguishes individuals (civilian and military), units, cities or institutions that received a commendation for acts of war during the Second World War and the Order of Arts and Letters in February 1996, whose rewards "persons who have distinguished themselves by their creation in the artistic or literary field or by the contribution they have made to the influence of the arts and letters in France and in the world"

Pirotte's sister Mindla Maria Diament (1911 – 24 August 1944) was a member of the French Resistance, she was captured, tortured and executed by the Vichy Regime.

Photographs in the collections

She stopped her professional activities in March 1968. From 1980 her work aroused enthusiasm and brought her fame. Then she exhibited in Poland, London, Charleroi, Stockholm, New York... Her photographs are included in the permanent collections of several European and American museums.

 Bibliothèque nationale, Paris (F)
 Photography museum at Charleroi (B)
 Musée Nicéphore Niépce, Chalon-sur-Saône (F)
 Fotografiska Museet, Stockholm (S)
 National Museum, Katowice (Pl)
 Art Museum, Lodz (Pl)
 United States Holocaust Memorial Museum, Washington (USA)
 International Center of Photography, New York (USA)
 Photographer’s Gallery, London (GB)
 Bibliothèque universitaire de Nanterre (F)
 Ministère des Anciens Combattants, Paris (F)
 Army Museume, Paris (F)
 National Association of Veterans and Friends of the Resistance, Marseille (F)
 Mémorial de la Shoah de Paris (F)
 Photography Museum à Anvers (B)
 Archives of Women Artists

References

1908 births
2000 deaths
20th-century Polish women artists
20th-century women photographers
Burials at Powązki Cemetery
Female resistance members of World War II
Jewish partisans
Members of the Francs-tireurs et partisans
20th-century Polish Jews
World War II photographers
Polish women photographers
Polish expatriates in Belgium
Polish expatriates in France
Jews in the French resistance
Women photojournalists